Battleground is a 1949 American war film that follows a company in the 327th Glider Infantry Regiment, 101st Airborne Division as they cope with the siege of Bastogne during the Battle of the Bulge, in World War II.  It stars Van Johnson, John Hodiak, Ricardo Montalbán, and George Murphy, features James Whitmore, and was directed by William A. Wellman from a script by Robert Pirosh.

The film portrays American soldiers as vulnerable and human.  While they remain steadfast and courageous, each soldier has at least one moment in the film when he seriously considers running away, schemes to get sent back from the front line, slacks off, or complains about the situation he is in. One writer – discarding Warner's successful Fighter Squadron of 1948 – describes Battleground as the first significant American film about World War II to be made and released after the end of the war.

Plot

In mid-December 1944, Private Jim Layton and his buddy Private William J. Hooper are assigned to the 327th Glider Infantry Regiment, 101st Airborne Division. As a newcomer, Layton receives a chilly welcome from his squad. Private First Class Holley returns to the company after recuperating from a wound.

Instead of going on leave in Paris, the squad is trucked back to the front because of a surprise German breakthrough in the Ardennes. They stop that night in Bastogne and are put up for the night in the apartment of a young woman, Denise, to whom Holley is attracted.

Jarvess later stands guard in the village, where he runs into some battle-weary soldiers making a "strategic withdrawal". The next morning, led by Platoon Sergeant Kinnie, the men are ordered to dig in on the outskirts of town. Just as they are nearly done, they are sent elsewhere and must dig in all over again.

Holley, Layton, and Kippton man a roadblock that night. German soldiers disguised as Americans infiltrate their position and later blow-up a nearby bridge. In the morning, Roderigues, a Latino from Los Angeles, is delighted by the novelty of snow from a heavy winter storm, but "Pop" Stazak, awaiting a "dependency discharge" that will send him home, is unimpressed. Layton goes to see Hooper, only to find he had been killed, and no one in his company had even known his name.

Kinnie informs the squad about the infiltration and dispatches a patrol comprising Holley, Roderigues, and Jarvess. Just before they start out, the platoon is shelled by German artillery, causing Bettis to panic and desert. Holley's patrol briefly skirmishes with the infiltrators. Roderigues is wounded by machine-gun fire from an enemy tank. Holley conceals him under a disabled jeep half-buried in snow, promising to return for him. Unfortunately, by the time Holley can return, Roderigues has died.

Sgt. Wolowicz, wounded by shrapnel, and a sick Cpl. Standiferd are sent to a field hospital. Later, Doc informs the 2nd Squad that the hospital has been captured.

Holley is appointed the new squad leader and partnered with Layton, while Pop is paired with Hansan. Pop's discharge finally comes in, but they learn from Kipp they are surrounded, meaning he's stuck and unable to leave.

Moved repeatedly, the 3rd Platoon is attacked at dawn. When it appears, the platoon will be overrun, Hansan is wounded, Holley flees, and Layton follows Holley. Ashamed, Holley turns around and leads a flanking counterattack that stops the Germans, during which Abner Spudler is killed reaching for his boots, as he can't sleep with them on.

After they get Hanson to an aid station, the squad runs into Bettis, who is doing K.P. duty. Holley finds Layton being entertained by Denise. Later, while on guard duty, they encounter some Germans who have come under a flag of truce to offer Brigadier General McAuliffe surrender terms; his famous reply - "Nuts!" - puzzles the Germans.

The squad is short of supplies, as bad weather has grounded the supply transport aircraft. Several men attend impromptu outdoor Christmas services held by a chaplain. (The chaplain had previously served as clergy at a Hanukkah ceremony, and when he asks a Jewish soldier how he did he responds, "Not bad for a beginner, padre.") That night, the Luftwaffe bombs Bastogne. Denise dies, and Bettis, slowed by his fear of returning to the lines, is killed by a collapsing house. The "walking wounded", including Hansan and a mess sergeant he befriends, are recalled for a last-ditch defense of the town.

As the platoon is down to its last few rounds of ammunition, the weather finally clears, allowing Allied fighter aircraft to attack the Germans and C-47 transports to drop supplies, enabling the 101st to hold. Afterward, Kinnie leads the platoon's survivors' rearward for a well-earned rest.

Cast

Production
Battleground was originally an RKO property, titled "Prelude to Love" to hide its subject matter, but was shelved when production head Dore Schary resigned, despite $100,000 having been put into the property to that point.  When Schary went to MGM, he purchased the rights to the script from RKO, over the objections of Louis B. Mayer, who believed the public was tired of war films.  At MGM, Robert Taylor and Keenan Wynn were reported to have been penciled in for the film, along with Van Johnson and John Hodiak, and the project was budgeted at $2 million. Wellman put the cast through some military training with Robert Taylor, a former navy officer who dropped out believing the role was not right for him.  He was replaced by Van Johnson.

Robert Pirosh had based the script on his own experiences during the Battle of the Bulge, although he did not serve with the 101st Airborne. Many of the incidents in the film were based on actual events, including the rejection of a German demand for surrender on December 22, 1944, with Brig. Gen. Anthony McAuliffe's one word response, "Nuts!". Twenty veterans of the 101st were hired to train the actors and appeared in the film as extras. Lt Col Harry Kinnard, who had been the 101st's deputy divisional commander at Bastogne, was the film's technical advisor.

The film was in production from April 5 to June 3, 1949, with location shooting in northern California, Oregon, and Washington state. Fort Lewis, Washington was used for the tank sequence showing the relief of the 101st Airborne by Patton's Third Army.  Shooting took 20 days less than was scheduled, due in part to innovative measures taken by Schary such as processing film as it was shot, then dubbing and cutting it so that scenes could be previewed within two days of being shot. The film came in almost $100,000 under budget.

Battleground received a number of premieres before its general release.  A private showing for President Harry S. Truman was arranged even before the premiere in Washington D.C. on November 9, 1949, which was attended by McAuliffe, who commanded the 101st during the siege. Two days later, the film premiered in New York City, and then on December 1 in Los Angeles.

Response 
Battleground was MGM's largest grossing film in five years. According to studio records it earned $4,722,000 in the US and Canada and $1,547,000 elsewhere resulting in a profit of $2,388,000, making it the studio's most profitable picture of the year. It was rated by Photoplay as the best picture of the year.

MGM released a similar film in 1951, Go for Broke!, also starring Van Johnson and directed by Pirosh.

Awards and honors

The film was nominated for the American Film Institute's 2001 list AFI's 100 Years...100 Thrills.

Historical accuracy

Although the film is a fictionalized version of the siege of Bastogne, there were no Germans disguised as Americans GIs operating around Bastogne. Operation Greif only focused on the front of the 6th SS Panzer Army, many miles to the north. The scenes depicting US troops quizzing each other about their culture (like sports and films) to verify they were not German infiltrators did occur once news of the operation became known.

The unit portrayed in the film is the fictional "2nd Squad, 3rd Platoon of Item Company" of the real 327th Glider Infantry Regiment, 101st Airborne Division. The 327th Glider Infantry Regiment never had an Item Company. When the airborne divisions were conceived early in World War II, glider regiments were given two battalions; the first had companies named Able, Baker, Charlie, and Dog while the second got Easy, Fox, George, and How. The 327th held the western perimeter of Bastogne.

References

External links 

 
 
 
 
 
 1949 review by Bosley Crowther in The New York Times

1949 films
1949 war films
American World War II films
American black-and-white films
1940s English-language films
Films directed by William A. Wellman
Films scored by Lennie Hayton
Films set in 1944
Films set in Belgium
Films whose cinematographer won the Best Cinematography Academy Award
Films whose writer won the Best Original Screenplay Academy Award
Films featuring a Best Supporting Actor Golden Globe winning performance
Metro-Goldwyn-Mayer films
Western Front of World War II films
World War II films based on actual events
Photoplay Awards film of the year winners
Films about the United States Army
Ardennes in fiction
1940s American films